The 2015–16 season was Ayr United's third season in League One and their 4th consecutive season in the third-tier of Scottish football. Ayr also competed in the League Cup, Scottish Cup and the Challenge Cup.

Summary

Season

Results and fixtures

Pre-season

Scottish League One

Scottish Championship play-offs

Scottish Challenge Cup

Scottish League Cup

Scottish Cup

Player statistics

Squad, appearance and goals

Club statistics

Final League table

Results by round

Ayr United play each other team in the Scottish League One four times, twice in the first half of the season (home and away) and twice in the second half of the season (home and away), making a total of 36 games.

Home attendances

{| class="wikitable sortable" style="text-align:center; font-size:90%"
|-
! scope="col" width=100 | Comp
! scope="col" width=120 | Date
! scope="col" width=60 | Score
! scope="col" width=250 class="unsortable" | Opponent
! scope="col" width=150 | Attendance
! scope="col" style="width: 2em;" class="unsortable" | 
|-
|Challenge Cup
|25 July 2015
|bgcolor=#BBF3BB|3 – 1
|Albion Rovers
|1,003
|
|-
|League Cup
|1 August 2015
|bgcolor=#BBF3BB|2 – 0
|Brechin City
|976
|
|-
|League One
|15 August 2015
|bgcolor=#BBF3BB|2 – 1
|Brechin City
|1,074
|
|-
|Challenge Cup
|19 August 2015
|bgcolor=#FFBBBB|0 – 2
|Rangers
|7,468
|
|-
|League One
|29 August 2015
|bgcolor=#FFFFBB|2 – 2
|Forfar Athletic
|1,243
|
|-
|League One
|1 September 2015
|bgcolor=#BBF3BB|5 – 2
|Stenhousemuir
|1,046
|
|-
|League One
|26 September 2015
|bgcolor=#FFFFBB|1 – 1
|Peterhead
|1,304
|
|-
|League One
|3 October 2015
|bgcolor=#BBF3BB|5 – 0
|Cowdenbeath
|1,171
|
|-
|League One
|31 October 2015
|bgcolor=#BBF3BB|3 – 1
|Stranraer
|1,415
|
|-
|League One
|14 November 2015
|bgcolor=#BBF3BB|1 – 0
|Albion Rovers
|1,389
|
|-
|League One
|21 November 2015
|bgcolor=#BBF3BB|3 – 0
|Airdrieonians
|1,403
|
|-
|Scottish Cup
|28 November 2015
|bgcolor=#FFBBBB|0 – 1
|Dunfermline
|1,576
|
|-
|League One
|12 December 2015
|bgcolor=#FFBBBB|1 – 2
|Dunfermline
|2,076
|
|-
|League One
|26 December 2015
|bgcolor=#BBF3BB|2 – 1
|Brechin City
|1,485
|
|-
|League One
|6 February 2016
|bgcolor=#FFBBBB|1 – 2
|Peterhead
|1,155
|
|-
|League One
|20 February 2016
|bgcolor=#BBF3BB|2 – 1
|Forfar Athletic
|763
|
|-
|League One
|1 March 2016
|bgcolor=#BBF3BB|4 – 1
|Cowdenbeath
|856
|
|-
|League One
|8 March 2016
|bgcolor=#BBF3BB|4 – 1
|Stenhousemuir
|889
|
|-
|-
|League One
|12 March 2016
|bgcolor=#FFBBBB|0 – 2
|Dunfermline Athletic
|2,190
|
|-
|League One
|26 March 2016
|bgcolor=#BBF3BB|2 – 1
|Stranraer
|1,244
|
|-
|League One
|9 April 2016
|bgcolor=#FFBBBB|0 – 1
|Albion Rovers
|1,044
|
|-
|League One
|30 April 2016
|bgcolor=#FFBBBB|0 – 3
|Airdrieonians
|1,594
|
|-
|Play-off
|7 May 2016
|bgcolor=#BBF3BB|2 – 1
|Peterhead
|1,848
|
|-
|Play-off
|15 May 2016
|bgcolor=#BBF3BB|0 – 0 (3-1p)
|Stranraer
|4,581
|
|-
|bgcolor="#C0C0C0"|
|bgcolor="#C0C0C0"|
|bgcolor="#C0C0C0"|
| Total attendance:
|40,793
|
|-
|bgcolor="#C0C0C0"|
|bgcolor="#C0C0C0"|
|bgcolor="#C0C0C0"|
| Average total attendance:
|1,670
|
|-
|bgcolor="#C0C0C0"|
|bgcolor="#C0C0C0"|
|bgcolor="#C0C0C0"|
| Total league attendance:
|24,317
|-
|bgcolor="#C0C0C0"|
|bgcolor="#C0C0C0"|
|bgcolor="#C0C0C0"|
| Average league attendance:
|1,296
|

Transfers

Players in

Players out

References

Ayr United F.C. seasons
Ayr United